Graham Williamson (born 15 June 1960) is a retired Scottish athlete who competed mainly in the 1500 metres. He is the 1979 Universiade 1500m champion. He also finished fourth representing Scotland at the 1982 Commonwealth Games and represented Great Britain at the 1983 World Championships. His Scottish record for the Mile of 3:50.64 has stood since 1982.

Career
Born in Glasgow, Williamson won the 1979 Summer Universiade 1500m title. His running club was Springburn Harriers. He still holds the Scottish national records for the 1000 metres (2:16.82), the Mile run (3:50.64) and the 2000 metres (4:58.38), as well as multiple Scottish U20 records (800m/1500/Mile/300m). He currently works for Adidas in Germany as Vice President of the tennis business unit and has a son who is also an athlete.

International competitions

References

Scottish male middle-distance runners
1960 births
Living people
Athletes (track and field) at the 1982 Commonwealth Games
Universiade medalists in athletics (track and field)
Universiade gold medalists for Great Britain
Medalists at the 1979 Summer Universiade
Medalists at the 1983 Summer Universiade
Commonwealth Games competitors for Scotland